Vladimir Petrovich Khatuntsev (1916, Moscow – April 19, 1979, Moscow) was a Soviet journalist and news executive. He was head of the central Soviet news agency TASS in 1978–79.

Khatuntsev was graduated from Pokrovsky Technical School, then studied at the All-Union Communist Institute of Journalism and the History Department of Moscow State University.

Following the German invasion of the Soviet Union in 1941, while Khatuntsev was a student at Moscow State University, he joined a militia battalion of the Presnensky District of Moscow. He then worked as a production manager in the defense industry.

In 1946, Khatuntsev joined TASS as a reporter handling foreign news, then became senior editor of the International News Radio division and a foreign correspondent in Finland. In 1960 he became Deputy General Director of TASS. He subsequently worked as Deputy Chief Editor of the mass-circulation national newspaper Labor, and, on July 11, 1978, became General Director of TASS.

Khatuntsev died on April 19, 1979. He is buried at Novodevichy Cemetery in Moscow.

.

References

Vladimir Khatuntsev (obituary) – Pravda, April 21, 1979
 

1916 births
1979 deaths
Soviet journalists
Russian male journalists
Writers from Moscow
Moscow State University alumni
20th-century Russian journalists